Busca is a comune (municipality) in the Province of Cuneo in the Italian region of Piedmont.

Busca borders the following municipalities: Brossasco, Caraglio, Costigliole Saluzzo, Cuneo, Dronero, Melle, Saluzzo, Roccabruna, Rossana, Tarantasca, Venasca, Villafalletto and Villar San Costanzo.

History 
The municipality of Busca at the beginning of 2019 absorbed the neighbouring comune of Valmala, thus enforcing the results of a referendum held in the summer of 2018.

Twin cities
Twin cities of Busca include the following:

  San Marcos Sud, Argentina 
  Cruz Alta, Argentina

References

External links
 Official website

Cities and towns in Piedmont